Clarence Eugene Iba (born November 5, 1940) is a former American college basketball coach. He was previously the Pittsburg State Gorillas men's basketball coach until 2010.  He was head coach at Houston Baptist from 1977 to 1985, Baylor from 1985 to 1992, and Pittsburg State from 1995 to 2010.  He is the son of college basketball coach Clarence Iba and nephew of college basketball coach Hank Iba.

Early life and education
Born in Joplin, Missouri, Clarence Eugene Iba attended the University of Tulsa, where he played basketball from 1958 to 1961 under his father, head coach Clarence Victor Iba. After graduating in 1963, Gene Iba went to the Navy Supply Corps School and coached its basketball team. Iba then attended Oklahoma A&M (now Oklahoma State University) and served as a graduate assistant for the basketball team under his uncle Henry Iba while completing his master's degree in business education.

Coaching career
In 1968, Iba became athletic director at  Cleveland High School in St. Louis. He then became head varsity basketball coach at Roosevelt High School in St. Louis in 1969 and led Roosevelt to the city championship in 1972.

Iba moved up to the college rankings in 1972 as an assistant coach at UTEP under Don Haskins and remained for five seasons, during which UTEP made the 1975 NCAA Tournament.

After UTEP, Iba became head coach at Houston Baptist in 1977. Iba turned around a program that went 11–44 in the past two years to a 14–13 record in 1979–80 and 18–10 record in 1980–81. The Trans American Athletic Conference (now Atlantic Sun Conference) named Iba the Coach of the Year in 1981. Houston Baptist improved further, making the 1984 NCAA Tournament.

Iba moved to Baylor as head coach in 1985 and led Baylor to post-season appearances in the 1987 NIT and 1988 NCAA Tournament. However, Baylor fell to 5–22 in the 1988–89 season and never made another postseason tournament. After the 1991–92 season, Baylor decided not to renew Iba's contract.

Iba became head coach at Division II Pittsburg State in 1995. By Iba's second season, Pittsburg State earned its first national ranking in five years and first-ever NCAA Tournament victory. On February 15, 1999, Pittsburg State was ranked #1 in Division II men's basketball. and Iba was named MIAA Coach of the Year 1999. In 15 seasons as head coach, Iba had a 261–172 record with five NCAA Tournament appearances.

Head coaching record

References

1940 births
Living people
American men's basketball coaches
American men's basketball players
Basketball coaches from Missouri
Basketball players from Missouri
Baylor Bears men's basketball coaches
College men's basketball head coaches in the United States
High school basketball coaches in the United States
Houston Christian Huskies men's basketball coaches
Oklahoma State University alumni
Pittsburg State Gorillas men's basketball coaches
Sportspeople from Joplin, Missouri
Tulsa Golden Hurricane men's basketball players
UTEP Miners men's basketball coaches